Itteringham is a village and civil parish in the English county of Norfolk, some  northwest of the market town of Aylsham.
For the purposes of local government, it falls within the district of North Norfolk.

The villages name origin is uncertain perhaps, 'homestead/village of Ytra's/Ytri's people' or 'homestead/village of the Ytteringas (= those dwelling outside)'.

Itteringham lies in the valley of the River Bure that eventually becomes a major part of the Norfolk Broads. The village has a pub, the Walpole Arms and a village shop. The converted watermill is a historical feature within the village. Mannington Hall is included in the parish.

The poet George Barker lived in the village and is buried in the churchyard.

Notes 

 http://kepn.nottingham.ac.uk/map/place/Norfolk/Itteringham

External links

Itteringham Village Website
Itteringham watermill history

 
Villages in Norfolk
Civil parishes in Norfolk
North Norfolk